The Château du Grand-Blottereau is a historic pavilion in Nantes, Loire-Atlantique, Pays de la Loire, France.

History
The pavilion was completed in 1747 to the design of architect Jean-Baptiste Ceineray, for Gabriel Michel, a Director of the French East India Company.

It was restored from 1988 to 1993.

Architectural significance
It has been listed as an official monument since 1992.

References

Châteaux in Loire-Atlantique
Monuments historiques of Pays de la Loire
Houses completed in 1747
Buildings and structures in Nantes